Thomas or Tom Nicholls may refer to:

Thomas Nicholls (sculptor) (c. 1825–1896), English sculptor
Thomas Nicholls (boxer) (1931–2021), British boxer
Tom Nicholls (born 1992), Australian rules footballer
Thomas David Nicholls (1870–1931), US Representative from Pennsylvania
Tom Nicholls (rower) (born 1983), Australian rower

See also
Tom Nichols (disambiguation)
Tom Nickalls (1828–1899), English stockjobber